Maharaja Ripudaman Singh (4 March 1883 – 12 December 1942), later known as Sardar Gurcharan Singh, was the Maharaja of Nabha State from 1911 to 1928, when he was deposed by the British. He later became an Indian revolutionary.

Early life

Ripu Daman Singh was born on 4 March 1883 at Nabha, the only son and heir of Hira Singh Nabha. From 1906 to 1908, he was a member of the Imperial Legislative Council of India, where he spoke on behalf of the Sikh interest and pioneered reformist legislation. He represented Nabha in 1911 at the coronation of King George V.

Maharaja

Upon his father's death in 1911, Ripudaman Singh ascended the gadi of Nabha; though recognised as Maharaja, he refused to be crowned by the Viceroy of India as was then the norm for a senior ruling prince in India. Continuing his interest in legal affairs, he reformed the state judiciary and enacted numerous pieces of progressive legislation, including laws providing for female education and a progressive marriage act. He also established a legislature and an executive council to govern Nabha. 

A staunch Indian nationalist, Ripudaman Singh befriended Lala Lajpat Rai and other prominent leaders of the swaraj movement. During the First World War, he refused to contribute Nabha state force contingents for the British Indian Army. As a result, he was arguably the only Indian ruler who did not receive any British war service-related honours. Shocked by the events of the Amritsar Massacre of Jalianwala Bagh in 1919, he publicly opposed the British, clashing with his distant cousin Bhupinder Singh of Patiala, who was a strong supporter of British rule in India.

Ripudaman Singh was granted a local salute of 15-guns in 1921, but he would not stay in British favour for much longer. In 1923, he was forced to relinquish control of Nabha to a British administrator after he was suspected of kidnapping and attempted murder through poisoning.

Deposition

In 1923, Ripudaman Singh agreed to leave Nabha and to settle at Dehra Dun. For this he was granted a large allowance. However, he continued to intrigue and attempt to regain control of Nabha to some degree. In 1927, he went on pilgrimage to Sri Abichal Nagar Hazur Sahib and retook the Khalsa initiation rites, taking the name of Gurcharan Singh. The next year, he was formally deposed by the British for sedition and succeeded by his eldest son, Pratap Singh Nabha. He was stripped of his rank and titles and exiled to Kodaikanal in the Madras Presidency. Thereafter, he was known officially as Gurcharan Singh.

Death

Ripudaman Singh died at Kodaikanal on 12 December 1942, aged 59. He had been succeeded in 1928 by his eldest son, Pratap Singh Nabha.

Family

Ripudaman Singh married three times, twice to ladies of royal blood and once morganatically:
1.  Jagdish Kaur (1884-20 February 1925). Married at Nabha in 1901. She had a daughter:
 Amar Kaur (8 October 1907-)
2. Sarojni Devi (1898-19?). Married at Nabha 10 October 1918 and had issue:
1. Kharak Singh, who succeeded as Maharaja of Nabha
2. Kharak Singh (d. 1970 in Canada)
3. Gurbaksh Singh (d November 1963) Married in 1950 Chandra Prabha Kumari (11 November 1932 – 22 October 2012). He had one son and two daughters:
 Viveck Singh
 Krishna Kumari (1951–1994)
 Tuhina Kumari
4. Kamla Devi Sahiba
5. Vimla Devi Sahiba
a.  Gurcharan Kaur (1904–1983). Married Gurcharan Kaur in 1923 and had issue:
1. Narinder Singh (1924-). A son and a daughter.
2. Fateh Singh (1935-). Two sons.
3. Jasmer Singh
4. Shamsher Singh
5. Vijay Kaur
6. Charanjeet Kaur. Two sons.
7. Nandhem Kaur

Titles

1883-1911: Sri Tikka Sahib Ripudaman Singh
1911-1927: His Highness Farzand-i-Arjumand, Aqidat-Paiwand-i-Daulat-i-Angrezistan, Brar Bains Sarmour, Raja-i-Rajagan, Maharaja Shri Ripudaman Singh Malvinder Bahadur, Maharaja of Nabha
1927-1928: His Highness Farzand-i-Arjumand, Aqidat-Paiwand-i-Daulat-i-Angrezistan, Brar Bains Sarmour, Raja-i-Rajagan, Maharaja Shri Gurcharan Singh Malvinder Bahadur, Maharaja of Nabha
1928-1942: Sardar Gurcharan Singh

Honours

Fellow of the Royal Geographical Society (FRGS)
Delhi Durbar Medal-1903
King George V Coronation Medal w/Delhi Durbar Clasp-1911

References

Indian Sikhs
Indian revolutionaries
Fellows of the Royal Geographical Society
1883 births
1942 deaths
Maharajas of Nabha
Members of the Imperial Legislative Council of India
Dethroned monarchs